The 2017 Morgan State Bears football team represented Morgan State University in the 2017 NCAA Division I FCS football season. They were led by second-year head coach Frederick Farrier, who was promoted to full-time head coach after being the interim head coach in 2016. The Bears played their home games at Hughes Stadium. They were a member of the Mid-Eastern Athletic Conference (MEAC). They finished the season 1–10, 1–7 in MEAC play to finish in last place.

On December 18, 2017 Fred Farrier was dismissed and released from his contract. His record at Morgan State was 4–18.

Schedule

Source: Schedule

References

Morgan State
Morgan State Bears football seasons
Morgan State Bears football